Resurrection man or resurrection men may refer to:
 A term for a "body snatcher"—a person who secretly exhumes dead bodies to sell them
 "The Resurrection Man", a fictional body snatcher and serial killer, the principal villain of the gothic novel serial The Mysteries of London
 Resurrection Men, a 2002 novel by Ian Rankin, thirteenth of the Inspector Rebus novels.
 "Resurrection Men" (Rebus), a 2007 episode of the Scottish crime drama Rebus
 Resurrection Man (character), a DC Comics superhero character
 Resurrection Man (film), a 1998 film directed by Marc Evans
 Resurrection Man, a 1994 novel by Eoin McNamee
 Resurrection Man, a 1995 novel by Sean Stewart